Daniel Frank Kelley, also known by the stage names Paige Turner and Showbiz Spitfire,  is an American drag queen, comedian, and singer who lives in New York City.  Kelley, a stage actor, created the character Paige Turner in 1996 at East of Eighth restaurant in Manhattan. Turner's fictitious parents are said to be Pee Wee Herman and Barbie.
Turner sings live and lip synchs during her over the top comedic performances.

Career
Paige Turner is one of the original creators, producers, and host of So You Think You Can Drag at New World Stages in Midtown Manhattan.  Billed as NYC's live drag reality show, SYTYCD completed its 5th season Fall 2014 with celebrity judges including Adam Lambert, Charles Busch, Zach Booth, and Jackie Hoffman.

Turner also performs parodies on YouTube which have included parodies of Carly Rae Jepsen's Call Me Maybe, One Direction's  What Makes You Beautiful and the Grindr Connection a parody of the Muppet's Rainbow Connection.

Grindr Connection won a 2015 GLAM AWARD for Best Music Video. She recently made her Provincetown debut at the legendary "Crown & Anchor" with her one-woman show and will return there summer of 2015.

Turner is usually referred to as "Showbiz Spitfire Paige Turner" and is known as the Holly Golightly of drag.

Turner coined the catch-phrase Slurp! Which is her term for cute sexy thangs and is the name of her long running show in NYC
 and also has spawned a line of merchandise.

Turner was the official host of the original LGBT Expo 2015. and will headline at the 1st Annual Austin International Drag Festival in May 2015.

See also
 LGBT culture in New York City
 List of LGBT people from New York City

References

External links
 

Comedians from New York (state)
American drag queens
Year of birth missing (living people)
Living people